John Entwistle (1932-2013), was a male cyclist who competed for England.

Cycling career
He represented England in the 1 Km time trial at the 1958 British Empire and Commonwealth Games in Cardiff, Wales.

Personal life
He was a telephone engineer and council leader.

References

1932 births
2013 deaths
English male cyclists
Cyclists at the 1958 British Empire and Commonwealth Games
Commonwealth Games competitors for England